Fritas de prasa, also known as Keftes de prasa and in Hebrew קציצות כרישה (Ksisoth Krisha), are a traditional Sephardi Jewish and Israeli fried potato-leek pancake similar to a latke, that is traditionally served for Hanukkah and other Jewish holidays.

History

Fritas de prasa have been traditionally served by Sephardi Jews for the holidays of Hanukkah, Passover, and Rosh Hashanah since the time of the Spanish Inquisition and forced expulsion of Jews from Spain.

Overview

See also
Latkes
Sfinj
Bimuelos
Keftes (Sephardic)

References

Sephardi Jewish cuisine
Israeli cuisine
Hanukkah foods
Fried foods
Potato dishes
Leek dishes